Turn-to (1951–1973) was a British-born, American-trained Thoroughbred racehorse and sire.

Background
He was sired by the British stallion Royal Charger, out of the French mare Source Sucree, whose sire, Admiral Drake, was third on the French sire list in 1949.

Imported to the United States of America as a yearling, Turn-to was bought at the Keeneland Sales for $20,000 to race for Capt. Harry F. Guggenheim's Cain Hoy Stable.

Racing career
As a two-year-old with Henry Moreno aboard, Turn-to won the Garden State Futurity and the Saratoga Special. He also won the Flamingo Stakes at three.

Retirement
Upon retirement, Turn-to initially stood at stud at Claiborne Farm before being moved to Spendthrift Farm after a disagreement between Guggenheim and Arthur B. Hancock.

His very successful progeny include First Landing, Hail To Reason, Best Turn, and Sir Gaylord.

Turn-to died in 1973 and is buried at Green Gates Farm, which is now part of Spendthrift Farm near Lexington, Kentucky.

Pedigree

References

1951 racehorse births
1973 racehorse deaths
Racehorses bred in the United Kingdom
Racehorses trained in the United States
Thoroughbred family 1-w
Chefs-de-Race